Reciprocal Recording was the name of a recording studio in the Ballard neighborhood of Seattle, Washington, United States that was founded in 1984 and officially closed in July 1991.

History
The studio was also the site of a Nirvana demo session on January 23, 1988. Jack Endino recorded ten songs with the band.

Recordings from Reciprocal
Dry as a Bone - Green River
Screaming Life - Soundgarden
Touch Me I'm Sick - Mudhoney
Hallowed Ground - Skin Yard
Superfuzz Bigmuff - Mudhoney
Primal Rock Therapy - Blood Circus
God's Balls - Tad
Buzz Factory - Screaming Trees
Bleach - Nirvana
Journey to the Center Of - Cat Butt
 Mudhoney - Mudhoney
 Another Pyrrhic Victory - Various Artists
 Change Has Come - Screaming Trees
 Between the Eyes - Love BatteryThe Winding Sheet - Mark LaneganFist Sized Chunks - Skin YardInside Yours - Gruntruck1000 Smiling Knuckles - Skin YardJanitors of Tomorrow - Gas HufferReturn to Olympus'' - Malfunkshun

References

External links

Official
Official site for Jack Endino

1984 establishments in Washington (state)
1991 disestablishments in Washington (state)
Buildings and structures in Seattle
Companies based in Seattle
Music of Seattle
Recording studios in Washington (state)
Triangular buildings